Pervomayskoye is a rural locality (a settlement) in Lisichanskoye Rural Settlement, Olkhovatsky District, Voronezh Oblast, Russia. The population was 109 as of 2010. There are 3 streets.

Geography 
Pervomayskoye is located 36 km southwest of Olkhovatka (the district's administrative centre) by road. Atamanovka is the nearest rural locality.

References 

Rural localities in Olkhovatsky District